Hujjat al-Islam (from  ḥujjat-u l-Islām) (also Hojatoleslam) is an honorific title meaning "authority on Islam" or "proof of Islam".

Sunni Islam
Its first recorded use was in a Sunni context, as a title for the 11th-century theologian al-Ghazali, due to his refutations of Hellenistic-influenced philosophers and Isma'ilis. It was later used as a term of respect for judges.

In the contemporary era, Egyptian Muhaddith Qadi Ahmad Shakir would confer the title "Hujjat al-Islam" to his master Muhammad Rashid Rida, upon his death. Deobandis granted this title to their leader Hanafi Maturidi theologian Muhammad Qasim Nanautavi for his debates with scholars of other religions and establishing Darul Uloom Deoband. In Iran there is some evidence of its application to early 20th-century Sunni scholars in imitation of the Shia usage.

Shia Islam
In Twelver Shia the title is awarded to scholars. It was originally applied as an honorific to leading scholars, but now the use indicates a status in the hierarchy of the learned below ayatollah.

Its earliest attested use for a Shia personage was during the Qajar period for Muhammad Baqir Shafti (d. 1843).

See also

 Allamah
 Shaykh of Sufism
 Sheikh ul-Islam

References

Arabic words and phrases
Islamic Persian honorifics
Religious leadership roles
Shia Islam
Islamic legal occupations